The Selenga or Selenge is a major river in Mongolia and Buryatia, Russia. Originating from its headwater tributaries, the Ider and the Delger mörön, it flows for  before draining into Lake Baikal. The Selenga therefore makes up the most distant headwaters of the Yenisey-Angara river system.

Carrying  of water into Lake Baikal, it makes up almost half of the riverine inflow into the lake, and forms a wide delta of  when it reaches the lake.

Periodic annual floods are a feature of the Selenga River. The floods can be classified as “ordinary”, “large” or “catastrophic” based on the degree of impact. Of the twenty-six documented floods that occurred between 1730 and 1900, three were “catastrophic”. The three “catastrophic” floods were the floods of 1830, 1869 and 1897.

It is part of the Arctic Ocean Basin and is located in northern Mongolia. Stone implement artifacts found on the Selenga River at the end of the 19th century have been used to form a link between Native Americans and their ancestors in East Asia. The climate of the Selenga basin is influenced by a powerful Siberian anti-cyclone. The weather consists of harsh winters and warm summers, with the river freezing from November to April.

The Selenga River delta is a Ramsar site, surrounded by marshlands. Found in the administrative region of the Republic of Buryatia, the wetlands are the habitat of a large number of threatened and endemic species, including the Siberian Baikal sturgeon and over 170 species of birds. The Selenge-Orkhon forest steppe includes the areas of the Orkhon and Selenge river basins. The region has scattered forests and extensive mountain ranges.

River modifications like the Irkutsk Hydroelectric Power Station have affected the environment of the Selenga Delta, causing it to become waterlogged. Activities including mining, agriculture, breeding and dumping of wastewater have also affected the environment of the river. There has been an observed degradation of water quality from these anthropogenic factors. Natural factors like erosion processes and weathering have also contributed to the decline in water quality.

The proposed Shuren Hydropower Plant Project was protested against by environmental groups because of the potential ecological ramifications it would have on the Selenga Delta. The reasons cited included potential disruption to the flow of the river and the breeding grounds of endemic fish species in Lake Baikal.

Name 
The name Selenge comes from Mongolian seleh, which means "to swim". 'Selenga' is the russified version of the same.

An alternate source believes the name originated with the Evenki word sele ("iron") to which the possessive nge suffix was added.

The Selenge Province of Mongolia is named after the river.

History

Archaeology 
At the end of the 19th century, evidence of Paleolithic culture was discovered in the Selenga River basin. The artifacts found were collections of stone implements.

During 1928 and 1929, G. P. Sosnovskii, under the purview of the Academy of Sciences of the U.S.S.R., directed an archaeological Stone Age study in the Selenga Valley near Kiakhta. In this expedition, Sosnovokii discovered remains of local Paleolithic culture in an area that stretched from "the valley of the Selenga River from the Mongolian Frontier down to Selenginsk."

The "Buriat-Mongol Archaeological Expedition from the Institute for the History of Material Culture, Academy of Sciences of the U.S.S.R and the Institute of Culture of the Buriat-Mongol A.S.S.R", undertook a Paleolithic study in the Trans-Baikal region from 1947 to 1958. Directed by A. P. Okladnikov, the study uncovered 30 new sites, including one that covered the area from Selenginsk to the Selenga River mouth, which provided evidence of a Paleolithic-type culture. Among these 30 sites was one called Ust-Kyakhta-3. While Ust-Kyakhta-3 was discovered in 1947, it was only later excavated in 1976 and 1978, yielding "more than 40,000 stone artifacts [and] abundant faunal remains". Further archaeological work in 2012 at the site found two human tooth fragments.

In a study published in volume 181 of the journal Cell, the link between Native Americans and their ancestors in East Asia was established using one of the tooth fragments found at the Ust-Kyakhta-3 site.

Floods 
Periodic floods are characteristic of the Selenga River, with small flooding events observed annually. There have been four periods of high-flooding: 1902-1908, 1932-1942, 1971-1977 and 1990-1998. The floods of the Selenga River can be classified based on the degree of impact.

"Ordinary" floods are floods accompanied by little damage, with maximum outcomes including river overflowing, floodplain flooding and small structural instability.

"Large" floods are those that cover a substantial section of the river and lead to flooding of territories. The maximum outcomes of "large" floods include flooding of settlements and agricultural land damage.

"Catastrophic" floods refer to floods that cover the majority of the river basin and cause flooding of whole settlements. These floods included the possibility of human casualties, and are estimated to occur 3-4 times per century.  Twenty-six floods occurred between 1730 and 1900, and of these 26, three floods were "catastrophic".

Flood of 1830 
The flood of 1830 in the Selenga River is the first flood that was recorded in some detail. On August 1, 1830, the Selenga River and its tributaries, the Chikoy, Dzhida, Khilok and Temnik Rivers, burst their banks. The flood plains and the islands in the Selenga River were completely flooded. On August 16, Verkhneudinsk, the city now known as Ulan-Ude, was flooded and the water level in the city reached . The flood destroyed fifty-four buildings in Selenginsk. After the flood, the town was moved to higher ground on the left bank of the Selenga River. There were also heavy losses in agriculture, with the flood making some pastures and hayfields unusable for an extended period after the flood. The river retreated to its banks by September 27.

Flood of 1869 
Water levels began to rise on July 24, 1869, but slowly decreased from August 5, 1869. The water level began to rise again on August 22, only beginning to decline from September 3. This flood was classified as a "large" flood. The water level in the Angara River also rose and did not return to its pre-flood levels by January 1870.

Flood of 1897 
The flood of 1897 began on August 11, when water levels started to rise in the middle and lower reaches of the Selenga River and reached its peak on August 14. The water level then proceeded to decrease gradually over ten days. The water level in the Selenga River was over  near Verkhneundinsk. The flood did not heavily impact settlements on the banks of the Selenga River, but there were reports of bridge and telegraph pole destruction between the towns of Selenginsk and Verkhneundinsk.

Impact of flooding 
Based on the observations of increased water level during floods, it has been deduced that flooding from the Selenge River can affect the environment of Lake Baikal. It can also cause an increase in runoff from the Angara River.

River course 
It flows from Mongolia and into east-central Russia, acting as the main tributary of Lake Baikal.

The Delger River flows from the Sangilen Mountains, "found on the border between Mongolia and the Russian republic of Tyva", while the Ider's headwaters are located in the Hangyn Mountains in central Mongolia.

Upon the meeting of the Delger and Ider Rivers, the Selenga River moves northeast from Mongolia and joins with the Orkhon River at Suhbaatar. The river then continues north into Russia.

Once in Russia, the river turns eastward towards Ulan-Ude, the capital of Buryatia and then goes northwards to Tataurovo. The Selenga proceeds to move westwards and then "flows through a delta into Lake Baikal."

Climate 
A powerful Siberian anti-cyclone is the major influence on the climate of the Selenga basin. It is formed in September and October and disappears in April and May. Due to the anti-cyclone, the 448,000-km2 river basin is prone to a climate of harsh winters, which consist of sunny days and low air temperatures, and warm summers. The river experiences "...extended summer floods and short occasional (event-driven) floods in the other seasons."

The section of the Selenga River from Suhbaatar to its mouth is ice-free from May to October. Travel across the river is possible during this period. From November to April, the river is covered with ice. The ice drift lasts from 3–6 days. From May to September, in spring and early summer, snowmelt enables maximum discharge.

For 80–90 days, starting in mid-June, the basin area experiences the summer season with precipitation totaling .  This is in contrast to autumn and winter, in which rainfall is typically . In mid-September, autumn begins, lasting for about 65 days.

Tributaries
The largest tributaries of the Selenga are, from source to mouth:

 Ider (right)
 Delger mörön (left)
 Khanui (right)
 Egiin Gol (left)
 Orkhon (right)
 Dzhida (left)
 Chikoy (right)
 Khilok (right)
 Uda (right)

Watershed

Selenga River basin 
The Selenga River basin is part of the larger international Arctic Ocean Basin and is located in northern Mongolia. A semi-arid region, the basin is 280,000 km2 and is Mongolia's largest basin.  The basin has two main rivers: the Selenga and the Selenga's tributary, the Orkhon.  The "major sub-basins are the Egiin, Ider, Orkhon and Tuul river basins" with Lake Baikal occupying 47% of the Selenga River basin. The terrain of the basin is dominated "by forest or grassland and is underlain by permafrost" according to an article published in 2003 by Ma et al.

Selenga River delta and the delta wetlands 
Lobate shaped and 40 km wide, the Selenga River delta is surrounded by marshlands. The formation of the delta is dependent on the sediment load carried by the river, with the lake tides having little impact in terms of geographical change. The sediment balance of the delta is dependent on physical processes, and this, in turn, affects the geochemical barrier functions of the area. During the period of the Irkutsk dam construction (1950–56), there was "increased sediment delivery to the delta" according to an article published in 2017 by Chalov et al.

The wetlands of the Selenga River delta are classified as a Ramsar site and are found within the administrative region of the Republic of Buryatia. The wetlands support a large number of threatened and endemic species, including over 170 species of bird. The area has mean air temperatures of 14 degrees Celsius in July and -19.4 degrees Celsius in January, with floods often occurring in summer after heavy rains.

Selenge-Orkhon forest steppe 
The Selenge-Orkhon forest steppe is a palearctic ecoregion that is a medium between steppe and taiga. The region includes the Orkhon and Selenge river basins, and features scattered forests as well as extensive mountain ranges.  The mean altitude of the landscape is 800-1200m, with flora like Rosa acicularis found at lower altitudes. The area has a dry and humid climate that is influenced by warm winds from the northeast steppe regions.

River modifications

Irkutsk Hydroelectric Power station 
The construction of Irkutsk Hydroelectric Power station began in spring of 1950 and was completed on December 29, 1956. Built on the Angara River, the station was designed to raise the water level of the Angara River to match the water level of Lake Baikal. It would then raise the water level of Lake Baikal by 1.5m. The power plant causes water-level fluctuations in Lake Baikal, which in turn causes part of the Selenga Delta to become waterlogged. The delta is drained in response to activities at the power station.

Shuren Hydropower Plant Project 
In 2015, Mongolia was reported to be planning the construction of a dam, named the Shuren Hydropower Plant, on the Selenga River. Environmental groups protested this plan, as they were concerned with the potential ecological ramifications, building a hydroelectric plant on the Selenga River, would have on the ecosystem of Lake Baikal. Disrupting the flow of the river would disturb the breeding grounds of many endemic fish species in Lake Baikal. This would have a flow-on effect on the rare birds and aquatic species that inhabit the area. The Shuren Hydropower Plant Project was proposed in 2013 and was under the review of a World Bank-funded environmental and social impact assessment. On September 27, 2017, the World Bank froze its tender process on the Shuren Hydropower Plant Project.

Natural history

Fish 
Leocottus kesslerii gussinensis and Leocottus kesslerii arachlensis are endemic subspecies of fish that are found in the Selenga River headwaters and the upper Khilok River. Lake Baikal is the habitat of the Siberian Baikal sturgeon. The Selenga river is a breeding ground for the sturgeon, with migration taking place within the river system. The fish has two migration periods, which occur during the warmer part of the year. The first migration period begins in the second half of April when the water temperature is 3-5 degrees Celsius and finishes in approximately mid-June. The second migration of the Baikal sturgeon is the main migration period. It coincides with the summer floods of the Selenga. When the water temperature begins to cool, this signals the end of  the migration. There is also a non-migrating species of sturgeon that inhabits the Selenga catchment.

Birds 
Large populations of migrating, breeding and moulting waterbirds assemble at the wetlands in the Selenga Delta.

Migrating species that occur in the Delta 

 Siberian crane, Grus leucogeranus
 Black stork, Ciconia nigra
 Bewick's swan, Cygnus bewicki
 Swan goose, Anser cygnoides
 Imperial eagle, Aquila heliacal
 Golden eagle, A. chrysaetos
 Peregrine falcon, Falco peregrinus
 Gyr falcon, F. gyrfalco
 Saker falcon, F. cherrug

Breeding species that occur in the Delta 

 White-tailed eagle, Haliaeetus albicilla
 Snipe-billed godwit, Macrorhamphus semipalmatus
 Whooper swan, Cygnus Cygnus
 Spotbill duck, Anas poecilorhyncha
 Falcated duck, A. falcata
 Bittern, Botaurus stellaris
 Baillon's crake, Porzana pusill
 Water-rail, Rallus aquaticus
 Corncrake, Crex crex
 Short-eared owl, Asio flammeus
 Azure tit, Parus caeruleus

Other fauna 
The Selenga delta also supports the following species:

 Baikal grayling, Thymallus arcticus baicalensis infrasubspecies brevioinnis
 Mongolian toad, Bufo raddei
 Rana terrestris
 Ikonnikov's bat, Myotis ikonnikovi
 Brown long-eared bat, Plecotus auritus
 Parti-coloured bat, Vespertilio murinus
 V. nilssoni

Hydrology

Water quality of the Selenga River 
Before the turn of the millennium, the Selenga River and Lake Baikal had rich aquatic ecosystems nearly untouched by human influence. Since the collapse of the Soviet Union in the 1990s, the basin, which contains vast plains, has been affected by agricultural, climatic and economic factors. This includes changes like forest losses, urbanization and a growth in farming and mining activities.

Factors that affect the water quality of the Selenga River can be classified as either anthropogenic or natural factors. Anthropogenic factors include mining activities, agriculture, breeding, dumping of wastewater into water bodies and water use. Natural factors include erosion processes and weathering. The escalation of anthropogenic factors can be correlated with pollution by "potentially toxic elements, including metals and persistent organic pollutants."

Mongolia has had rapid growth in GDP since 1999, fueled by agriculture, mining and light industry. These activities, particularly mining, have threatened the surface water quality of the Selenga River and adjacent groundwater.

A study published in volume 12 of the journal Water, found that based on the Mongolian National Standard, "the main pollutants of the Selenga River are Zn ... As ... and Pb ..."  They also found that metal content in the river water was tens or hundreds of times higher in sites closer to urban and mining areas. Based on data observing toxicological and bioaccumulation effects on aquatic biota, the contamination has been shown to have an ecological impact.

Economy

Uses of the river 
The Selenga River has an influential role in managing the economic futures of Mongolia and Russia. It is used extensively for activities that include hay harvesting, mining, grazing, commercial and sport fishing.

Many of these uses contribute to the degradation of the river’s water quality, with the main Mongolian sources of pollution, including the Zaamar gold placer, the Shar River gold mining, settlements and agriculture.

There are ten large-scale wastewater treatment plants in the Selenge River basin in Mongolia. These wastewater treatment plants are located in the Mongolian cities of Tsetserleg, Bulgan, Darkhan City, Uliastai, Erdenet City, Arvaikheer, Sukhbaatar, Zuunmod, Murun and Ulaanbaatar.

The city of Ulan-Ude uses the Selenga River as its primary source of water for its municipal water supply, using 60 wells with submersible pumps to withdraw water.

See also
Baikal sturgeon
Irkutsk Hydroelectric Power Station
List of rivers of Mongolia
List of rivers of Russia
Selenga Highlands
 Ulaanbaatar

References

Rivers of Mongolia
Rivers of Buryatia
International rivers of Asia
Khövsgöl Province